Lembah Keramat is a place located right in Selangor (Gombak district) in Ulu Klang area but use Kuala Lumpur postcode. It is known as a Malay reserved residential area.

Lembah Keramat also known as AU5, is located right beside the MRR2 Highway in Ulu Klang. Nearby areas including Taman Melawati, Kampung Pasir, Kampung Fajar, Taman Permata, AU4, and AU3

References

Populated places in Selangor